Moccas Court is an 18th-century country house which sits in sloping grounds overlooking the River Wye north of the village of Moccas, Herefordshire, England. It is now a luxury guest house and function venue.

The house was built in 1775–81 by the architect Anthony Keck for Sir George Armyand Cornewall to replace the existing Manor house near the church. Built in three storeys to a rectangular plan, it was constructed of brick with stone dressings and a stone tile roof. It has a seven bay frontage with a single storey semi-circular plan porch which was added in 1792. The grounds were landscaped to plans by Capability Brown. The house is a Grade I listed building.

The Cornewall family occupied Moccas until 1916 when Sir Geoffrey Cornewall, the 6th Baronet, moved to a smaller house on the estate, after which the house was let on a long lease. After death of Sir William Cornewall, the 7th Baronet in 1962, the estate passed to the Chester-Master family who owned the house until 2014. They undertook a programme of restoration and modernisation and offered luxury guest accommodation.

In late 2014, the house and estate of circa 200 acres was sold, for an undisclosed price, to Linda Bennett, founder of the LK Bennett shoes and fashion brand. It is believed her husband was brought up in the locality.

References

Grade I listed buildings in Herefordshire
Country houses in Herefordshire
Grade I listed houses